Union County is a county located in the southern part of the U.S. state of Iowa. As of the 2020 census, the population was 12,138. The county seat is Creston. Organized at a time of tensions before the Civil War, the county was named in 1853 for the union that people wanted to preserve. The rural county's peak of population was in 1930. Its economy is based on agriculture and related industries.

History
The first permanent European-American settlers came in 1849 and 1850. Mormons had earlier established Mt. Pisgah in the eastern part of the county as a way station as they traveled west, but had left this area by 1848. Settlers used Pisgah as a base to establish farms along the Grand and Platte rivers that run through the county. They found a market for their produce with the emigrants traveling overland to California to take part in the Gold Rush. Travelers often sought shelter with the settlers along the way. In 1851 one settler counted 2,600 teams driven by emigrants to California; they often drove herds of sheep and cattle, trying to get animals to the gold fields to feed the miners, but many died along the way.

The first village was Petersville, founded in 1853, the same year that the county was organized. The county was named for the union which many people wanted to preserve, at a time of rising tensions between the North and the South.

After the American Civil War, railroad construction linked the areas of the county, giving rise to new towns, and gave access to other markets. In 1868 the railroad reached Afton, Iowa, and the next year Creston, the county seat, was made a division point. The railroad built service facilities there, a roundhouse and related structures. The railroad brought immigrants and migrants to the area, who were attracted to the fertile soil as farmland. Immigrants came from across central and eastern Europe, as well as from eastern states of the US. The Burlington Northern Santa Fe Railroad (BNSF) continues to be important in the area, serving as the chief network for hauling grain and coal. Over the years, it drew workers from industrial cities such as Chicago to Creston.

The county has a fair each year. In the late 19th century, southwestern Iowa claimed the title of Bluegrass Capital, having cultivated bluegrass throughout the area. In 1889 the Bluegrass Association was founded, made up of representatives of the 18 counties in this region. They built a Bluegrass Palace on the Union County Fairgrounds. It was designed by Louis Syberkro, an artist, and constructed by J. C. Woodruff, both of Creston. Made of sod and baled hay on a wood frame, the building was 100 feet square, with corner turrets and a central tower 92 feet high. It held exhibits of farm products and resource commodities from counties of the association, including  wood, coal, sandstone, and marble. The palace was such a success that the Bluegrass Association commissioned a larger one the following year, which supplied about three times as much space. In a separate wing was an auditorium large enough to hold 2,000 people.

Geography

Major highways
 U.S. Highway 34
 U.S. Highway 169
 Iowa Highway 25

Adjacent counties
Adair County  (northwest)
Madison County  (northeast)
Clarke County  (east)
Ringgold County  (south)
Adams County  (west)

Demographics

2020 census
There were 5,784 housing units, of which 5,169 were occupied.

2010 census
There were 5,937 housing units, of which 5,271 were occupied.

2000 census

As of the census of 2000, there were 12,309 people, 5,242 households, and 3,354 families residing in the county. The population density was 29 people per square mile (11/km2). There were 5,657 housing units at an average density of 13 per square mile (5/km2).  The racial makeup of the county was 98.44% White, 0.23% Black or African American, 0.17% Native American, 0.25% Asian, 0.32% from other races, and 0.58% from two or more races. 1.02% of the population were Hispanic or Latino of any race.

There were 5,242 households, out of which 27.50% had children under the age of 18 living with them, 53.10% were married couples living together, 8.00% had a female householder with no husband present, and 36.00% were non-families. 31.30% of all households were made up of individuals, and 14.40% had someone living alone who was 65 years of age or older. The average household size was 2.29 and the average family size was 2.87.

In the county, the population was spread out, with 23.30% under the age of 18, 8.70% from 18 to 24, 25.30% from 25 to 44, 24.00% from 45 to 64, and 18.70% who were 65 years of age or older. The median age was 40 years. For every 100 females there were 92.10 males. For every 100 females age 18 and over, there were 89.00 males.

The median income for a household in the county was $31,905, and the median income for a family was $41,453. Males had a median income of $27,700 versus $20,760 for females. The per capita income for the county was $16,690. About 7.40% of families and 11.40% of the population were below the poverty line, including 13.80% of those under age 18 and 9.30% of those age 65 or over.

Communities

Cities

Afton
Arispe
Creston
Cromwell
Lorimor
Shannon City
Thayer

Unincorporated communities

Talmage

Townships

 Dodge
 Douglas
 Grant
 Highland
 Jones
 Lincoln
 New Hope
 Platte
 Pleasant
 Sand Creek
 Spaulding
 Union

Census-designated place
Kent

Population ranking
The population ranking of the following table is based on the 2020 census of Union County.

† county seat

Politics

See also

National Register of Historic Places listings in Union County, Iowa

References

External links

Union County website
City-Data Comprehensive Statistical Data and more about Union County

 
1853 establishments in Iowa
Populated places established in 1853